The Estonia cricket team toured Finland in June 2022 to play two Twenty20 International (T20I) matches at the Kerava National Cricket Ground in Kerava. The series provided both sides with preparation for the  2022 ICC Men's T20 World Cup Europe sub-regional qualifier tournaments. Finland won both of the matches, winning by 23 runs and 11 runs respectively.

Squads

T20I series

1st T20I

2nd T20I

References

External links
 Series home at ESPN Cricinfo

Associate international cricket competitions in 2022